Port Louis is a district of Mauritius, located in the northwest of the island, it is the smallest district and has the highest population density. The district wholly encompasses Port Louis, the capital of the country. Port Louis district has an area of 42.7 km2 and the population estimate was at 118,123 as at the end of 2019.

History

Places of interest

The district hosts the Aapravasi Ghat, a UNESCO World Heritage Site since 2006.

References 

 
Districts of Mauritius